William Robert Bousfield  (12 January 1854 – 16 July 1943) was a British lawyer, Conservative politician and scientist.

Biography
Bousfield was the son of Edward Tenney Bousfield, an engineer, and his wife Charlotte Eliza Collins, who was a noted diarist. He was born at Newark-on-Trent, from which his family moved to Sticklepath in 1856 and then to Bedford, where they arrived in September 1858.

He attended Bedford Modern School before serving an apprenticeship as an engineer. In 1872 he was admitted to Caius College, Cambridge, winning a scholarship there in 1873. Following graduation as 16th Wrangler in 1876 and a brief period as a lecturer at the University of Bristol, where he delivered the new institution's first ever lecture (on Mathematics at 9a.m.  10 October 1876), he decided to study law. In 1880 he was called to the bar at the Inner Temple. His knowledge of engineering led to him becoming a renowned expert on patent law. He became a Queen's Counsel in 1891 (which office became King's Counsel on the accession of a King in 1901). He was elected a bencher of the Inner Temple in 1897, and treasurer in 1920.

Politically, Bousfield was a Conservative, and stood unsuccessfully twice for election as Member of Parliament for Mid Lanarkshire in the 1880s. He entered the Commons at a By-election at Hackney North in May 1892. He held the seat at the 1895 and 1900 elections, before being unseated by Thomas Hart-Davies, when the Liberals swept to power at the 1906 general election. He did not stand for election again.

Bousfield was an enthusiastic amateur scientist, particularly interested in physical chemistry and electrolysis. He worked in collaboration with T M Lowry, and their work was published in the Proceedings of the Royal Society, of which Bousfield was made a fellow in 1916. When his health began to fail in the 1920s, he was no longer able to carry out laboratory experiments, and turned his attention to psychology. He wrote three books on the subject: A Neglected Complex (1924), The Mind and its Mechanism (1927) and The Basis of Memory (1928).

Personal life
In 1879 he married Florence Kelly of Shanklin, Isle of Wight. Their sons included Paul Bousfield, a specialist in nervous diseases; and John Keith Bousfield (1893–1945), an army officer, businessman, and member of the Legislative Council of Hong Kong.

W. R. Bousfield died in Ottery St Mary in July 1943, aged 89.

References

External links 
 

1854 births
1943 deaths
People educated at Bedford Modern School
Conservative Party (UK) MPs for English constituencies
UK MPs 1892–1895
UK MPs 1895–1900
UK MPs 1900–1906
Fellows of the Royal Society
Hackney Members of Parliament
British physical chemists
Academics of University College Bristol
English barristers
Alumni of Gonville and Caius College, Cambridge
English King's Counsel